Ambulance car may refer to:
 Ambulance
 Nontransporting EMS vehicle